Stellantchasmus is a genus of trematodes in the family Heterophyidae.

Species
Stellantchasmus aspinosus Pearson, 1964
Stellantchasmus falcatus Onji & Nishio, 1916
Stellantchasmus gallinae (Oshmarin, 1971) Pearson & Ow-Yang, 1982

References

Heterophyidae
Trematode genera